Fanny Addison (December 1847 – 7 January 1937), also known as Mrs. Henry Mader Pitt, was an English actress professionally known as Fanny Addison Pitt.

Born in December 1847 in Birmingham, England, Fanny was the eldest daughter of the comedian, Edward Phillips Addison and sister of the actress Carlotta Addison (1849–1914).
She appeared in 1867 in the Adelphi Theatre London.  The next year, she was at the Queen's Theatre, Long Acre in La Vivandière by W. S. Gilbert. In 1870, she played Lady Psyche in Gilbert's The Princess.  In 1881, she was performing in New York.

She died on 7 January 1937.

References

External links

left-to-right: Fanny Addison Pitt, Sydney Cowell and Ethel Barrymore during dress rehearsal for Captain Jinks of the Horse Marines, 1901
Fanny A. Pitt, Sydney Cowell and Ethel Barrymore in the same scene (with H. Reeves-Smith) during the run of Captain Jinks of the Horse Marines

1847 births
1937 deaths
19th-century English actresses
English stage actresses